{{DISPLAYTITLE:2013 TV135}}

On 20 September 2013, it came to perihelion (closest approach to the Sun). The asteroid was discovered on 12 October 2013 by Ukrainian amateur astronomer Gennadiy Borisov with a custom  telescope using images dating back to 8 October 2013. It was rated level 1 on the Torino Scale from 16 October 2013 until JPL solution 26 on 3 November 2013. It reached a Palermo Technical Impact Hazard Scale rating of -0.73. It was removed from the JPL Sentry Risk Table on 8 November 2013 using JPL solution 32 with an observation arc of 27 days.

Past Earth-impact estimates 
On 16 October 2013, near-Earth asteroid  (with a short observation arc of 7 days) was listed on the JPL Sentry Risk Table with 1 in 63,000 chance of impacting Earth on 26 August 2032. This gave the asteroid a Torino Scale rating of 1. The peak estimated threat from the asteroid occurred 19–20 October 2013 when Leonid Elenin and NEODyS estimated the odds of impact to be 0.03% (1 in 3,800). On 31 October 2013, NEODyS estimated the odds of impact to be 1 in 4,330 and the Sentry Risk Table estimated the odds of impact to be 1 in 6,250. On 7 November 2013, with a short observation arc of 25 days, the Sentry Risk Table estimated it had about a 1 in 169,492,000 chance of an Earth impact on 26 August 2032. It was removed from the JPL Sentry Risk Table on 8 November 2013 using JPL solution 32 with an observation arc of 27 days.

, the NEODyS nominal best-fit orbit shows that  will be  from Earth on 26 August 2032.

Orbit 

With an orbital inclination of only 6.7 degrees and perihelion 0.99 AU from the Sun, the point of perihelion is controlled by close approaches to Earth. With a short observation arc of 108 days, it has an orbit with an Uncertainty of 4. Given the relatively large size of the asteroid, astronomers were able to refine the orbit of this asteroid over several months.

Impact effects 
An Earth impact would have the kinetic energy of 3,200 megatons of TNT, approximately 60 times the energy of Russia's 50 Mt Tsar Bomba. This would also be equivalent to 16 times the 1883 eruption of Krakatoa which was 200 Mt and had a Volcanic Explosivity Index of 6.

See also 
Asteroid impact avoidance
List of asteroid close approaches to Earth
Torino scale

Notes

References

External links 
 2013 TV135 Orbit at the Minor Planet Center
 2013 TV135 Impact Risk at JPL / 2013TV135 Impactor Table at NEODyS
 WayBack Machine entry for 31 October 2013 showing a 1 in 22,000 chance of impact on 2032-08-26 with a 21-day observation arc
 Los Angeles Times : Ukrainian astronomers say asteroid might collide with Earth -- in 2032
 Minor Planet Center : MPEC 2013-U03 : 2013 TV135
 Space Fellowship : 400-Meter-Wide Asteroid Could Hit Earth in 2032
 No, the Earth (Almost Certainly) Won’t Get Hit by an Asteroid in 2032 (Phil Plait)
 Asteroid 2013 TV135: doomsday again (yawn) (Stuart Clark, 18 October 2013)
 Big asteroid buzzes past Earth and will again in 19 years (CNN, 18 October 2013)
 NASA: Less Than 1% Chance That Asteroid 2013 TV135 Will Hit Earth In 2032 (Elizabeth Howell Universe Today, 18 October 2013)
 Why Is the Chance of an Asteroid Impact in 2032 Going Up? (Phil Plait)
 
 
 

Minor planet object articles (unnumbered)

20131012